Xingyi is a county-level city administered by the Qianxinan Buyei and Miao Autonomous Prefecture, in the southwest of Guizhou Province, China.

Geography
The city has an area of 2911 square kilometers, and a population of 784,032 as of 2010.  It is under the administration of the Qianxinan Buyei and Miao Autonomous Prefecture.

Transportation
Xingyi is served by the Nanning–Kunming Railway and by the Xingyi Wanfenglin Airport.

Biodiversity hotspot
Based on Red Data Book listed endangered species of fish, amphibians, reptiles, and mammals, Xingyi is one of nine vertebrate biodiversity hotspots of China.

Climate

External links
Xingyi government website

References

 01
County-level divisions of Guizhou
Qianxinan Buyei and Miao Autonomous Prefecture